Christine Broadway is a French-born television personality active in Australia in the 1970s and early 1980s.

Biography
She appeared on ATV-O's The Box, the Australian versions of The Gong Show,  Second Chance and Have A Go, as well as presenting weather reports on the nightly news service. Broadway later had a guest role in an episode of the short-lived series Hotel Story, playing a beauty pageant contestant.

In cinema, Broadway appeared in the 1980 film Final Cut. In her private life, she is married to Australian juggler Johnny Broadway and is retired living on the Gold Coast, Queensland.

External links

The Box at the Aussie Soap Archive
Second Chance at Memorable TV
Have A Go listing at TelevisionAU

Australian television actresses
Living people
Year of birth missing (living people)
Place of birth missing (living people)